Amal Al Salam Zgharta Football Club  is an association football club based in Zgharta, Lebanon, that competes in the . Founded in 2015, Amal Salam Zgharta acts as Salam Zgharta's reserve team.

The club played the first round of the 2019–20 Lebanese FA Cup as one of two Lebanese Third Division clubs in the tournament; they were defeated 1–4 by AC Sporting.

See also 
 List of football clubs in Lebanon

References 

Football clubs in Lebanon
Salam Zgharta FC
Lebanese reserve football teams